The Village Smithy is a 1942 Donald Duck  animated short film, produced in Technicolor by Walt Disney Productions, distributed by RKO Radio Pictures.

Plot
Donald Duck is working to add a new iron rim on a wagon wheel and to put a shoe on Jenny, a donkey. He runs in difficulty with both.

Voice cast
Clarence Nash as Donald Duck

Home media
The short was released on December 6, 2005 on Walt Disney Treasures: The Chronological Donald, Volume Two: 1942-1946.

References

External links
 
 

1942 films
1942 animated films
1942 short films
1940s Disney animated short films
Donald Duck short films
Films produced by Walt Disney
RKO Pictures short films
RKO Pictures animated short films
Films with screenplays by Carl Barks